Glenea melissa is a species of beetle in the family Cerambycidae. It was described by Francis Polkinghorne Pascoe in 1867. It is known from Indonesia.

Subspecies
 Glenea melissa melissa Pascoe, 1867
 Glenea melissa vanessa Pascoe, 1867

References

melissa
Beetles described in 1867